Mahadaji Shinde (b. 23 December 1730 – 12 February 1794), later known as Mahadji Scindia or Madhava Rao Sindhia, was a Maratha statesman and ruler of Ujjain in Central India. He was the fifth and the youngest son of Ranoji Rao Scindia, the founder of the Scindia dynasty.

The Maratha Resurrection in North India
Mahadaji was instrumental in resurrecting Maratha power in North India after the Third Battle of Panipat in 1761, and rose to become a trusted lieutenant of the Peshwa, leader of the Maratha Empire. Along with Madhavrao I and Nana Fadnavis, he was one of the three pillars of Maratha Resurrection. During his reign, Gwalior became the leading state in the Maratha Empire and one of the foremost military powers in India. After accompanying Shah Alam II to Delhi in 1771, he restored the Mughals in Delhi and became the Naib Vakil-i-Mutlaq (Deputy Regent of the Empire).<ref>Vakil-i-Mutlaq (Regent of the Empire)'</ref> Mahadji Shinde's principal advisors were all Shenvis.

He annihilated the power of Jats of Mathura and during 1772-73 destroyed the power of Pashtun Rohillas in Rohilkhand and captured Najibabad. His role during the First Anglo-Maratha War was greatest from the Maratha side since he defeated the British in the Battle of Wadgaon which resulted in the Treaty of Wadgaon and then again in Central India, single handed, which resulted in the Treaty of Salbai in 1782, where he mediated between the Peshwa and the British.

In 1787, Mahadji attempted to invade Rajputana but he was repulsed by the Rajput armies at Lalsot. However, he regrouped he forces and in 1790, he defeated the Rajput kingdoms of Jodhpur and Jaipur in the battles of Patan and Merta, thus capturing all of Rajput

Treaty of Salbai

After the British defeat, Hastings through Murre proposed a new treaty, known as the Treaty of Salbai, between the Peshwa and the British that would recognize Sawai Madhavrao as the Peshwa and grant Raghunath Rao a pension. The treaty also returned to Shinde all his territories west of the Yamuna and so was made to withdraw to Ujjain. A resident, Mr. David Anderson (1750-1825), of St. Germains (who had negotiated the treaty) was at the same time appointed to Mahadji's court.

After the Treaty of Salbai in 1782, he invaded and overpowered the Rajput states, particularly Jodhpur and Jaipur through the Battle of Patan and the Battle of Merta.

Later years
Mahadji became Naib Vakil-i-Mutlaq (Deputy Regent of the empire) of Mughal affairs, and the Mughals also gave him the title of Amir-ul-Umara (head of the amirs) in 1784.

In 1788, Isma'il Beg, a Persian who served as a general in the Mughal army along with a few hundred Mughal and Rohilla troops led a revolt against the Maratha Empire, the major power which dominated North India at the time. The reason for this revolt is unknown but most suspect that he was trying to bring the Mughals glory back to North India and depose the Marathas. However the revolt was crushed when Ismail Beg along with his soldiers was destroyed and killed by Mahadji Scindia's armies. After his death, a Rohilla chief named Ghulam Kadir and an ally of Isma'il Beg, took over Delhi, capital of the Mughal dynasty and deposed and blinded the Mughal emperor Shah Alam II, placing a puppet on the Delhi throne. However on 2 October 1788, Mahadji Scindia, upon hearing this news, quickly assembled his army and recaptured Delhi, killing Ghulam Kadir and restoring Shah Alam II to the throne and acting as his protector.

He remained loyal to the English during the revolt of 1781 and played an important role in capturing Maharaja Chait Singh of Benares and crushing the revolt 

Another achievement of Mahadji was his victory over the Nizam of Hyderabad's army in a battle. 

After the peace made with Tipu Sultan of Mysore in 1792, Mahadji exerted his influence to prevent the completion of a treaty between the British, the Nizam of Hyderabad, and the Peshwa, directed against Tipu.

Death and legacy

After the Battle of Lakheri, Mahadji was now at the zenith of his power, when he died, at his military camp at Wanavdi near Pune on 12 February 1794. He left no heir, and was succeeded by Daulat Rao Scindia.
 
Keeney, the English biographer of Mahadaji Shinde, has described Mahadaji as the greatest man in India in the 18th century. Mahadaji Shinde's role was instrumental in establishing Maratha supremacy over North India.

Shinde Chhatri, located in Wanawadi, in Pune is a memorial dedicated to Mahadji Shinde. It is a hall that marks the spot of Mahadji Shinde's cremation on 12 February 1794. The three storied memorial in Rajput architectural style, is one of the most significant landmarks in the city.

In popular culture
 In 1988 Doordarshan Serial  Bharat Ek Khoj produced and directed by Shyam Benegal also Picturised an episode where the titular role of Mahadaji Shinde was played by noted TV actor Shreechand Makhija.

 In 1994, a TV series named The Great Maratha aired on DD National based on the life of Mahadaji Shinde. Shahbaz Khan portrayed the character of Mahadji Shinde.

 In the 2019 Bollywood film Panipat, Mahadaji Scindia was portrayed by Sanjay Khapre.

See also
Mahadji Scindia Sports Complex

References

Further reading
 
 Hunter, William Wilson, Sir, et al. (1908). Imperial Gazetteer of India, Volume 12. 1908–1931; Clarendon Press, Oxford.
 Keene, H. G. The Fall of the Moghul Empire of Hindustan e-text
 
 
 Karkare, Neelesh Ishwarchandra (2013). [श्रीनाथ माधवजी  : महायोद्धा महादजी की शौर्यगाथा / प्रथम संस्करण / प्रकाशन वर्ष - २०१३ / लेखक :- पण्डित नीलेश ईश्वरचन्द्र करकरे] / (Research book) Shreenath Madhavji: Mahayoddha Mahadji Ki Shourya Gatha/ First Edition 
 
 Markovits, Claude (ed.) (2004). A History of Modern India: 1480–1950''. Anthem Press, London.
 Mishra, Amitabh (1 January 2007). Heritage Tourism in Central India: Resource Interpretation and Sustainable Development Planning. Kanishka Publishers, Distributors. p. 42. .
 
"Mosque and Tomb of the Emperor Sultan Mahmood of Ghuznee". British Library. Retrieved 1 November 2014.
101 pilgrimages. Outlook India Pub. 2006. p. 79

External links

1730 births
1794 deaths
Scindia dynasty of Gwalior
Peshwa dynasty
Indian military leaders
Hindu monarchs